A Night in May is a 1938 German comedy film directed by Georg Jacoby and starring Marika Rökk, Viktor Staal, and Karl Schönböck.

It was made by UFA the leading German company at the Babelsberg Studios in Berlin. The film's sets were designed by the art directors Erich Grave and Max Mellin. Some location filming took place around Wannsee.

Cast
Marika Rökk as Inge Fleming
Viktor Staal as Willy Prinz
Karl Schönböck as Waldemar Becker
Gisela Schlüter as Alma
Oskar Sima as Direktor Fleming Jr.
Albert Florath as Direktor Fleming Sr.
Ingeborg von Kusserow as Friedl
Mady Rahl as Mimi
Franz Arzdorf as Berghoff
Ursula Herking as Johanna
Ludwig Schmitz as Schupo Emil

References

Bibliography

External links

Ein Nacht im Mai at MoviePilot.de

German comedy films
Films set in Berlin
Films directed by Georg Jacoby
Films of Nazi Germany
UFA GmbH films
German black-and-white films
1938 comedy films
Films shot at Babelsberg Studios
1930s German films